The Skins Game was an unofficial-money event on the PGA Tour from 1983 to 2008. It took place in November or December each year after the end of the official PGA Tour season. It was recognized by the PGA Tour but did not count towards the official money list. It was most recently sponsored by LG and was officially known as the LG Skins Game, hosted at the Indian Wells Golf Resort in Indian Wells, California.

The Skins Game differed from most PGA Tour golf tournaments in several ways. Only four golfers were invited to the tournament and the golfers played to win individual holes or "skins" in a match play format. Each hole was assigned a different monetary value and the golfer who won the hole with the best score outright won the money for that hole. In the event that two or more golfers tie (which is called "halving") on a hole, the skin is carried over to the next hole. In the event that two or more golfers halve the final hole, a playoff began until one golfer won a hole outright. (In a playoff that requires more than one playoff hole, if a player is not one of those that halve the playoff hole, he is eliminated—it was not "one tie, all tie".)

Fred Couples was given the nickname of "Mr. Skins" because of his dominance in the Skins Game. He won $4,405,000 and 77 skins in 11 appearances. He won five of the Skins Games overall.

The 2009 Skins Game, originally set for Thanksgiving weekend 2009, was cancelled in May 2009 after LG pulled out of sponsorship; the Associated Press speculated that poor television ratings for the event led to its permanent demise.

In 2018, Jack Whigham and Bryan Zuriff revived the idea, with Zuriff noting that he was a fan of the original Skins Game concept. He retooled it into The Match, which has been held most years on Thanksgiving weekend ever since.

Prize money was awarded as follows in 2008:

1 This is known as a "super skin".
The total prize money is exactly $1 million.

Rule change

In 2001, the player winning a hole outright had to tie or win the next hole to collect his skins from the previous hole, called "validation". This was very tough to do. Greg Norman was the only one that could back up his win on the previous hole. He won the 17th and tied for low on the 18th hole to collect $800,000, the largest skin collected for one hole. He won the $200,000 in a playoff to win the entire $1 million prize money.  This rule was rescinded the following year.

Milestones
1983: First Skins Game held at Desert Highlands in Scottsdale, Arizona, with Jack Nicklaus, Tom Watson, Arnold Palmer, and Gary Player as the participants. NBC televises the event throughout the U.S. with Vin Scully as the announcer. The only notable affiliate not to televise the first event was KYW-TV in Philadelphia (now a CBS owned station).
1987: Lee Trevino made a hole in one on the par-3 17th hole.  Though the event was taped, CBS's Brent Musburger told viewers about the hole in one during a halftime report on The NFL Today.
1991: Coverage moved to ABC Sports, after NBC got the rights to Notre Dame football.
1996: Tiger Woods makes the first of three straight appearances in the event. He never won the event.
2001: Only time the validation system was used (see above). Also, the first (and only) time a player wins all 18 skins.

Winners

See also
Wendy's Champions Skins Game, a Champions Tour event (1988–2011)
LPGA Skins Game, an LPGA Tour event (1990–2003)
Telus World Skins Game, Canadian event (1993–2012)

References

PGA Tour unofficial money events
Recurring sporting events established in 1983
Recurring sporting events disestablished in 2008